This is a list of current professional football clubs located in Pakistan and the leagues and states they play in.

By league and division
 Anchan Premier League Gamba Skardu
 Pakistan Premier League
PFF League

List of clubs grouped by league and province

Balochistan

Gilgit Baltistan

Islamabad Capital Territory

Khyber Pakthunkhwa

Punjab

Sindh

Professional Clubs
Karachi United Women
Friends F.C.Tip
 Balochistan United W.F.C
 Diya W.F.C.
 Young Rising Star W.F.C.
 Cantt United F.C
 Garrison Football Academy
 Ghazi  F.C
  Rose F.C Lahore
  Maqpoon Sports Club FC Skardu

See also
 Pakistan Premier League
 Geo Super Football League

Pakistan
 
Football clubs
Football clubs